Ron Rubin (born May 12, 1959) is a Canadian veteran voice actor and writer whose credits include X-Men (Morph), Avengers (The Vision), C.O.P.S. (Dr Badvibes), Police Academy (Carey Mahoney), Beetlejuice (Doom Buggy), Stickin' Around (Mr. Lederhosen), and Care Bears (Messy Bear). His voice is most easily recognized as Tark from Kratt’s Creatures as well as that of Artemis from the English translation of Sailor Moon.

Rubin also worked as a grip on Wild Kratts and as a writer for Fame, Sharon, Lois & Bram's Elephant Show, and Palmerstown U.S.A. He was personal assistant to Lewis Arquette and an extra on ALF in the year 1985. He is godfather to Martin Kratt’s son Gavin. Emergency contact and power of attorney for voiceover star Heather Bambrick. He was the executive in charge of the American documentary series The American Experience.

Filmography 
 Artemis in the DiC/Cloverway English dub of Sailor Moon
 Sgt. Slipper in the US version of Dennis the Menace
 Messy Bear in 2005's The Care Bears' Big Wish Movie
 Dr. Badvibes in the popular 1980s cartoon C.O.P.S.
 Ttark on the PBS show Kratts' Creatures
 Kaptain Skurvy and Junior the Klaptrap on Donkey Kong Country
 Bot-ler ("Olie's Bot-ler"), Lunchbox, and Announcer ("Lunchmaster 3000") Rolie Polie Olie
 Germs Pondscum in Beetlejuice
 Robo Fuzz in Monster by Mistake
 Carey Mahoney in the animated Police Academy series
 Various characters in Arthur, Angela Anaconda, Ned's Newt, Rolie Polie Olie, ProStars, Free Willy, Anatole, The Rosey and Buddy Show, Committed, Little Bear, Tales from the Cryptkeeper, Journey to the Centre of the Earth, Mischief City, Hammerman, Roboroach, Clifford's Fun with Letters, Ace Ventura: Pet Detective, AlfTales, Highlander: The Animated Series, Dog City, Knights of Zodiac, Marvin the Tap-Dancing Horse,Tiny Toon Adventures, Corduroy, Redwall, Bad Dog, Dinosaucers, Timothy Goes to School, The Neverending Story, Bob and Margaret, Blazing Dragons, Freaky Stories, Rupert, Card Captors, Braceface, Jacob Two-Two, Redwall, Cadillacs and Dinosaurs, WildC.A.T.S., Sam and Max: Freelance Police, Rescue Heroes, Babar, Pelswick, Hello Kitty and Friends, Keroppi and Friends, Little People: Big Discoveries, Hippo Tub Company, Beyblade, Watership Down, Traffix, Dex Hamilton: Alien Entomologist, Pecola, ALF: The Animated Series, Bakugan Battle Brawlers, Mini-Man, Stories From My Childhood, George Shrinks, The Berenstain Bears, Grossology, Maggie and the Ferocious Beast, Little Rosey, Jayce and the Wheeled Warriors, Beverly Hills Teens, Maxie's World, Skatoony, Flash Gordon, Don Martin's MAD Magazine, Silver Surfer, Starcom: The U.S. Space Force, Moville Mysteries, King, The Count of Monte Cristo, Quads!, Medabots, Birdz, Franklin, Eckhart, My Dad the Rock Star, Undergrads, Girlstuff/Boystuff, Power Stone, 6teen, Cyberchase, The Super Mario Bros. Super Show!, The Magic School Bus, Mythic Warriors: Guardians of the Legend, Blaster's Universe, Mr Men and Little Miss, Pippi Longstocking, My Pet Monster, The Adventures of Tintin, Ultraforce, Slam Dunk, Power Stone, Jane and the Dragon, Wayside, Little Shop, The New Archies, Sylvanian Families, Interlude, Air Master, Noddy, Growing Up Creepie, The Adventures of Super Mario Bros. 3, Puppets Who Kill, The Dumb Bunnies, Pandalian, What It's Like Being Alone, Delilah and Julius, Iggy Arbuckle, Chilly Beach, Miss Spider's Sunny Patch Friends, Toot and Puddle, Super Why!, The Future Is Wild, Magi-Nation, Captain Flamingo, Anne of Green Gables, Wilbur, Bedtime Primetime Classics, The Wumblers, Spider Riders, Miss BG, Busytown Mysteries, Ruby Gloom, Funpak, Gerald McBoing Boing, Turbo Dogs, Monster Force, Spliced, Kassai and Leuk, Clifford's Fun with Numbers, Scaredy Squirrel, Franny's Feet, Willa's Wild Life, Jimmy Two-Shoes, The Manly Bee, The Amazing Spiez!, Get Ed, Diabolik, Uncle Joe's Cartoon Playhouse, Boom Unit, The Giggle Factory, Carl Squared and The Ripping Friends
 On Camera Guest appearances in Top Cops, The Emergency Room, Secret Service, Variety Tonight, Inside Stories, Comedy Club (TV Series), It's Only Rock 'n' Roll, Frances Farmer Story, Casby Awards, An Evening with the Arts and Young Again
 Trike in Harry and His Bucket Full of Dinosaurs
 The Vision in The Avengers: United They Stand
 Quacker's duck noises in Piggsburg Pigs
 Airball and Slyme in Stunt Dawgs
 Tanzog in Time Warp Trio
 Sprog in Atomic Betty
 Teenage guy in Young Again
 Glenn Miller in The Last Convertible
 Wayne in one episode of Katts and Dog
 Boogeyman and Brother Herman in Yin Yang Yo!
 Theo and Pico the parrot in the 1995 video game Laura's Happy Adventures
 The Comic in Kung Fu: The Legend Continues
 Manny in Totally Spies!
 Frenzel in Erky Perky
 Bat in Peep and the Big Wide World
 Jason McNulty in The Accuser
ladybug in Almost Naked Animals
 Raticus and Rod in Flying Rhino Junior High
 Morph in X-Men
 Flinch in Di-Gata Defenders
 Mr. Lederhosen in Stickin' Around
 Himself in Sharon, Lois & Bram's Elephant Show Season 3 (Soap Box Derby) and Season 4 (Radio Show)
 Dr. Phelmholz in The ZhuZhus
 Master XOX in Sidekick
 The Blegh in Big Blue

External links

Living people
Canadian male voice actors
20th-century Canadian male actors
21st-century Canadian male actors
1959 births